Gabriella Hall (born Laura Rosa Saldivar November 11, 1966) is a model and actress from Los Angeles best known for her appearances in Cinemax TV shows and movies such as Erotic Confessions and Beverly Hills Bordello. To date, she has appeared in over 58 TV shows and movies. She has posed for Playboy magazine and appeared in one of their videos, Playboy: Girls of the Internet (as Gabriella Skye).

Biography
Hall was born in Los Angeles but grew up on the beaches of Northern California. She auditioned for fashion print work on a whim as a way to pay for veterinarian school. Her fashion print work led to runway modeling in Europe before she returned to California.

Hall had always been fascinated with movies from when she was a little girl with Rita Hayworth being her favorite actress at the time. Her first major role was in a movie called Centerfold (later renamed Naked Ambition). After that, she would go on to appear in 18 features over the next two years. It was her appearance in the Nicolas Roeg drama, Full Body Massage, (as the younger flashback of Mimi Rogers' character, Nina) that drew the attention of  film producers such as Curtis Hansen, and kept her steadily employed in a variety of movies.

She has moved into producing her own movies with Jacqueline Hyde (2005).

Selected filmography
Jacqueline Hyde (2005), as Jackie Hyde
Deviant Obsession (2002), as Evelyn Hathaway
Sex Files: Alien Erotica II (2000), as Nurse Swanson
Virgins of Sherwood Forest (2000), as Roberta O'Sullivan
Sex Files: Alien Erotica (1999), as Anne Gallo
The Exotic Time Machine (1998), as Daria
The Erotic Misadventures of the Invisible Man (1998) as Kelly Parkinson
Centerfold (1996), as Gail
Love Me Twice (1996), as Andrea
Full Body Massage (1995) (credited as Laura Saldivar), as Young Nina

Notable TV appearances
Lady Chatterly's Stories playing "Joy" in episode: "Fantasy" 2001
Kama Sutra playing "Paula" in episode: "Love Quarrels"
Kama Sutra playing "Shannon" in episode: "Women of the Royal Harem"
Beverly Hills Bordello (9 episodes)
Women: Stories of Passion playing "Young Eileen" in episode: "Motel Magic" (episode # 31) 1997
Erotic Confessions playing "Laura" in episode: "Boss's Orders" (episode # 9) 1995
Erotic Confessions playing "Angela" in episode: "The Bad Boy" (episode # 2) 1996
Erotic Confessions playing "Madelyn Reed" in episode: "Madelyn's Laundry" (episode #4) 1996 (3 episodes)

References

External links

1966 births
Living people
Hispanic and Latino American female models
American film actresses
20th-century American actresses
21st-century American actresses
American television actresses
Actresses from Los Angeles
American actresses of Mexican descent
American people of Italian descent